Kalpana is an Indian television series of DD National channel, based on the story of a girl who supports her family, especially her drunkard father through her talent of singing. The series airs every Monday at 9pm IST. Besides, the series is noted as one of the popular television shows of Doordarshan network, and has received 4.22 TVR rating from its third episode.

Cast
 Ekta Saraiya ... Kalpana
 Parikshit Sahni
 Kuldeep Dubey
 Suresh Chatwal
 Brij Sawhney

References

DD National original programming
Indian drama television series